Thapa (pronunciation:) is the surname commonly used by North Indian and Nepali people belonging to the Kshatriya caste of Hinduism.  and Magar group, a Sino-Tibetan speaking ethnicity.

Etymology
Thapa was a Paikelā (warrior) rank of the medieval Khasa Kingdom. Other Paikelās include Khaḍgās, Rānās and Buḍhās. It is proved through many inscriptions in the present day region of Old Khas Kingdom. Yasu Thapa, Dasu Thapa and Raj Thapa were known warriors from the herostone pillars. One of the herostone inscription of Thapa warrior:
 The above inscription also proved that Thapa and Khadka (Khadga) were mere military ranks that was born by sons of same father in the country of Khas people.

Khas Thapa or Commonly Thapa
Khas Thapa are patrilineal groups descended from Khas people . They are popularly known as Thapa Kshatriya or Thapa Kaji. This group was divided into many clans like Bagale Thapa, Godar, Hriksen", ', Punwar (Pawar), Suyal Lamichhane, and "Mugali" 

Kshatriya Thapa dynasty were one of the four noble family to be involved in active politics of Nepal together with Shah dynasty, Basnyat/Basnets and Pandes before rise of Rana dynasty. and ruled between 1806 and 1837 and 1843 to 1845. Thapas played important role in Unification of Nepal and had held many prestigious post in the Malla Court and Bijayapur Court. This family grew prominent during the rule of King Prithvi Narayan Shah and were established as dominant faction during reign of King Rana Bahadur Shah. 
After the assassination of King Rana Bahadur Shah, Bhimsen Thapa rose to the event killing all his enemies and catapulting the Thapa family as most dominant faction in the Royal Court of Nepal.

Thapa family were strengthened in the Royal court by including family members of the another Thapa Bharadar Amar Singh Thapa. Bada (Elder) Kaji Amar Singh Thapa was a legendary military commander and National Hero of Nepal. Thapas have important role in Anglo-Nepalese War where Colonial Power British India Company had major loss at First Campaign. Colonel Ujir Singh Thapa was sector commander at Jitgadh, Kaji Ranajor Singh Thapa at Jaithak, Sardar Bhakti Thapa at Deuthal, Colonel Ranabir Singh Thapa at Makawanpurgadhi and Bada Kaji (Elder Kaji) Amar Singh Thapa at Malaon. Bhimsen's nephew PM Mathabarsingh Thapa was known for his charisma from whom Jung Bahadur Rana rose to power. Thus, the state of administrative Thapa rule in Nepal is politically termed as Thapadom. Since the Shahs have ruled over Nepal, Chhetri Thapas have been struggling against Pandeys, Kunwars, Basnyats and other Chhetris to takeover the royal court of Nepal.

Bagale Thapa

Bagale Thapa (Nepali:बगाले थापा) is a prominent clan within Khas Thapa. Bagale Thapas were skillful at both warfare and administration. They claim Aatreya Gotra in the Gotra system of Hinduism.  
The genealogy traces the lineage of all Bagale Thapas to male progenitor (Mūlapuruṣa) King Kalu Thapa Kshatri, who first ascended to the throne at Kāndāmālikā on Saka Era 1111. The DDC of Myagdi district also confirms historical evidence of rule of Thapa dynasty of Takam State (1246-1545 B.S.) by founder Kalu Thapa, whose dynasty continued for 300 years only to be defeated by Dimba Bam Malla to form bigger Parbat State.

Amar Singh Thapa, the war hero of Anglo-Nepalese war belongs to this clan. Similarly, Prime Minister Bhimsen Thapa, the most revered among Thapas also belongs to this clan. His nephew Mathabarsingh Thapa was the seventh Prime Minister of Nepal.

Punwar/ Panwar Thapa
Punwar Thapa is another clan of Thapa Chhetri/Khasas. Punwar/ Panwar, a variant of Parmara dynasty, is a Rajput honorific claimed by different groups. Punwar Thapas claim their ancestry from Rajasthan, India. Sardar Bhakti Thapa a war commander at Anglo-Nepalese war, belonged to the Punwar Thapa clan.

Godar Thapa
Godar Thapa is a clan within Chhetri Thapa of Khas origin. They claim Kashyap Gotra in the Gotra system of Hinduism.

Lamichhane Thapa
They Belong to Garg Gotra. They were residents of the Jumla than later they came and settled in Kaski. Later significant number of wealthy and powerful Lamichanne Thapas came to settle Dhankuta(Muga) in the footsteps of the expanding Gorkhali state. They were known as Mugali Thapa.
Mugali Thapas themselves have dominated the Sens, the Ghimires, Rais and Kamis they drew unto themselves as they settled far east of their Pokhreli origins in the wake of the Gorkhali conquest of Nepal 250 years ago.
Unification of Nepal. They are called Mugali Thapa. Only non Tibetan/Mongolian Victoria Cross winner of Nepal Sher Bahadur Thapa, Former 5 time Prime Minister Surya Bahadur Thapa and Janakabi Dharmaraj Thapa are some notable people of this Khasa clan of Thapa Kaji. Poet Dharmaraj Thapa had published a Lamichhane Thapa genealogy in 1982.

Parajuli Thapa
Parajuli Thapas were mentioned in the legend of the Kunwar family.  They waged a war against the King of Kaski who wanted the daughter of a nobleman Ahirama Kunwar without legal marriage (as a concubine). Ahirama Kunwar denied the request of the King and Parajuli Thapas successfully protected and helped Ahirama Kunwar to escape to Gorkha Kingdom with his two other sons, one being the later Gorkhali warlord Ram Krishna Kunwar.

Magar Thapa

The original home of the Magar people was to the west of Gandaki river, and Rapti Bheri Zone and roughly speaking, consisted of that portion of Nepal which lies between and around about Gulmi, Argha, Khanchi, and Palpa Rukum Rolpa Piuthan . This bit of country was divided into twelve districts known as Barha Magarat (Confederation of Twelve Magar Villages)  During the medieval period, the whole area from Dhading to Sikkim was called the Magarat as the area was inhabited by Magars. A second Confederation of Eighteen Magar Kingdoms known as Athara Magarat also existed which was primarily inhabited by Kham Magars.  Magars who were the Farmers and Hunter in mid-western and western regions, their estates were eventually invaded by the Khasa dynasty.

Thapa magars is one of the six tribes (clans) of the Magar community . In former days, any Thapa Magars who had lost three generations of ancestors in battle became a Rana Magar To name a few—other Thapa Magar clans include Saru, Gaha, Bagalia, Darlami, and they are each further sub-divided into many sub-clans.

Famous Thapa Magars include Arun Thapa, Lakhan Thapa Magar, Biraj Thapa Magar, Victoria Cross holders like Kulbir Thapa, Lalbahadur Thapa and Netrabahadur Thapa.

Links with Indian Royals
Thapas have marital links with Maratha Chhattari royals of Baroda State. Pyar Jung Thapa's daughter, Pragya Shree was married to former King of Baroda State
Pratap Singh Rao Gaekwad's grandson Pratapsinh Sangramsinh Gaekwad.

Modern times
Modern day Thapas are prominent in wide professions. Manjushree Thapa, an English language author is known for Forget Kathmandu: An Elegy for Democracy'' (2005),  was shortlisted for the Lettre Ulysses Award in 2006. Gagan Thapa, a popular 40-year-old minister is in the Nepalese cabinet. Ujwal Thapa, the President of Bibeksheel Nepali was a leading youth activist and entrepreneur.

Notable people with the surname Thapa

References

Sources

External links
 Bagale Thapa Blogspot by Bhim Bahadur Thapa Kshatri
 Bagale Thapa Programme at Galkot, Baglung

Surnames
Surnames of Nepalese origin
Nepali-language surnames
Khas surnames